Neil James Cherry  (29 September 1946 – 24 May 2003) was a New Zealand environmental scientist.

Biography

Early life and family
Cherry was born in Christchurch on 29 September 1946. His parents were James Conrad Cherry and Mona Hartley, who had married in 1940. Cherry could trace his ancestry back to the Cressy, one of the First Four Ships that started the settlement of Canterbury.

Cherry was educated at Christchurch Technical College, and went on to study physics at the University of Canterbury, graduating BSc(Hons) in 1969 and PhD in 1971. His doctoral thesis, supervised by R.G.T. Bennett and G.J. Fraser, was titled A study of wind and waves.

In 1968, Cherry married Gae Denise Miller, and the couple went on to have two children.

Career

Cherry specialised most recently in the effects of electromagnetic radiation on human health, following his earlier work in meteorology and wind energy.

Politics

He boosted Labour's vote by 6.73%, but fell 311 votes short of defeating the incumbent MP Philip Burdon. He lost out on the Labour nomination to Lianne Dalziel but was, by his own estimation, the second preference and pledged to campaign for Dalziel.

Cherry served as a Councillor on the Canterbury Regional Council (Environment Canterbury) from 1992.

Later life and death

Cherry was diagnosed with motor neurone disease in 2001, and became increasingly immobile until his death in 2003.

Honours and awards
In 1990, Cherry was awarded the New Zealand 1990 Commemoration Medal. In the 2002 New Year Honours, Cherry was appointed an Officer of the New Zealand Order of Merit, for services to science, education and the community.

Selected works

References

External links
Profile (archived on 10 August 2003)
Life story (15 parts)               

1946 births
2003 deaths
University of Canterbury alumni
Academic staff of the Lincoln University (New Zealand)
People from Christchurch
Environmental scientists
New Zealand scientists
Unsuccessful candidates in the 1987 New Zealand general election
Canterbury regional councillors
Officers of the New Zealand Order of Merit
Neurological disease deaths in New Zealand
Deaths from motor neuron disease